The 107th United States Congress was a meeting of the legislative branch of the United States federal government, composed of the United States Senate and the United States House of Representatives. It met in Washington, D.C. from January 3, 2001 to January 3, 2003, during the final weeks of the Clinton presidency and the first two years of the George W. Bush presidency. The apportionment of seats in this House of Representatives was based on the 1990 United States census.

The House of Representatives had a Republican majority throughout the session, while the Senate was tied 50–50 for only the third time in history resulting in numerous changes in the majority. Vice President Al Gore gave Democrats a majority for 17 days, then a Republican majority after Dick Cheney became Vice President on January 20, 2001. Senator Jim Jeffords (R-VT) became an independent who caucused with the Democrats on June 6, 2001, giving the party a 51–49 majority for the rest of the Congress.

When Bush was sworn in as president on January 20, the Republicans held a federal trifecta for the first time since the 83rd Congress in 1955.

Major events

A rare even split in the United States Senate, the defection of a Senator, and the inauguration of a new Vice President, led to three changes in majorities.

 January 3, 2001: The 107th Congress officially begins, with the Senate split 50–50. Democrat Al Gore — the outgoing Vice President — briefly gives the Democrats a majority.
 January 3, 2001: First Lady Hillary Clinton, wife of outgoing President Bill Clinton, became the first, and, to date, only presidential spouse to hold political office (briefly serving as both First Lady and Senator).
 January 20, 2001: George W. Bush was sworn in as the 43rd President of the United States; simultaneously, Dick Cheney was sworn in as the 46th Vice President, giving Republicans a  Senate majority.
 May 24, 2001: Senator Jim Jeffords left the Republican Party, becoming an independent who caucused with the Democrats, giving them a majority from June 6.
 September 11, 2001: The September 11 attacks occurred.
 September 20, 2001: President Bush reported to a joint session of Congress, announcing the investigation into the September 11 attacks.
 October 7, 2001: Operation Enduring Freedom began with airstrikes against the Taliban.
 October 9, 2001: Anthrax spores were mailed to, among others, two Senators, Majority Leader Tom Daschle (D-SD) and Patrick Leahy (D-VT).
 December 2001: Accounting scandals arise from the financial practices of Enron and WorldCom.
 June 12, 2002: John Howard, the Prime Minister of Australia, addressed a joint session of Congress. The address was originally scheduled for September 12, 2001, but was postponed after the September 11 attacks.
 October 25, 2002: Senator Paul Wellstone (D-MN), dies in a plane crash, and non-caucusing Independence Party member Dean Barkley is appointed to hold the seat until a special election was held.
 November 23, 2002: Jim Talent wins the United States Senate special election for a Missouri seat, giving Republicans the majority once again (though formal reorganization was delayed until the 108th United States Congress convened).

Major legislation

 June 7, 2001: Economic Growth and Tax Relief Reconciliation Act, 
 September 18, 2001: Authorization for Use of Military Force of 2001, Pub.L. 107-40
 September 22, 2001: Air Transportation Safety and System Stabilization Act, Pub.L. 107-42
 September 28, 2001: United States-Jordan Free Trade Area Implementation Act, Pub.L. 107-43
 October 26, 2001: "USA PATRIOT" Act, 
 October 27, 2001: International Money Laundering Abatement and Financial Anti-Terrorism Act of 2001, Pub.L. 107-57
 November 19, 2001: Aviation and Transportation Security Act, Pub.L. 107-71
 December 18, 2001: MD-Care Act, Pub.L. 107-84
 December 21, 2001: Zimbabwe Democracy and Economic Recovery Act of 2001, Pub.L. 107-99
 January 8, 2002: No Child Left Behind Act, 
 January 8, 2002: District of Columbia Police Coordination Amendment Act of 2001, Pub.L. 107-113
 January 11, 2002: Small Business Liability Relief and Brownfields Revitalization Act, 
 March 9, 2002: Job Creation and Worker Assistance Act, 
 March 27, 2002: Bipartisan Campaign Reform Act (McCain-Feingold), 
 May 13, 2002: Farm Security and Rural Investment Act of 2002, 
 May 14, 2002: Hematological Cancer Research Investment and Education Act, Pub.L. 107-172
 May 14, 2002: Enhanced Border Security and Visa Entry Reform Act of 2002, Pub.L. 107-173
 May 15, 2002: Notification and Federal Employee Antidiscrimination and Retaliation (No-FEAR) Act of 2002, Pub.L. 107-174
 July 30, 2002: Sarbanes–Oxley Act, 
 August 5, 2002: Born-Alive Infants Protection Act of 2002, Pub.L. 107-207
 August 6, 2002: Trade Act of 2002, 
 October 1, 2002: National Construction Safety Team Act, Pub.L. 107-231
 October 16, 2002: Authorization for Use of Military Force Against Iraq, 
 October 21, 2002: Sudan Peace Act, 
 October 29, 2002: Help America Vote Act, 
 November 6, 2002: Rare Diseases Act of 2002, Pub.L. 107-280
 November 25, 2002: Maritime Transportation Security Act of 2002, Pub.L. 107-295
 November 25, 2002: Homeland Security Act, 
 November 26, 2002: Terrorism Risk Insurance Act of 2002, Pub.L. 107-297
 December 17, 2002: E-Government Act of 2002,

Party summary

Senate

House of Representatives

Leadership

Senate

 President: Al Gore (D), until January 20, 2001
 Dick Cheney (R), from January 20, 2001
 President pro tempore: Robert Byrd (D), until January 20, 2001
 Strom Thurmond (R), January 20 – June 6, 2001
 Robert Byrd (D), from June 6, 2001

Republican leadership
 Minority Leader: Trent Lott (R), until January 20, 2001, and from June 6, 2001
 Majority leader January 20 – June 6, 2001
 Minority Whip: Don Nickles (R), until January 20, 2001, and from June 6, 2001
 Majority whip January 20 – June 6, 2001
 Republican Conference Chairman: Rick Santorum
 Republican Conference Secretary: Kay Bailey Hutchison
 Republican Campaign Committee Chair: Bill Frist
 Republican Policy Committee Chairman: Larry Craig

Democratic leadership
 Majority Leader: Tom Daschle (D), until January 20, 2001, and from June 6, 2001
 Minority leader January 20 – June 6, 2001
 Majority Whip: Harry Reid (D), until January 20, 2001, and from June 6, 2001
 Minority whip January 20 – June 6, 2001
 Democratic Policy Committee Chairman: Byron Dorgan
 Democratic Conference Secretary: Barbara Mikulski
 Democratic Campaign Committee Chairman: Patty Murray
 Democratic Chief Deputy Whip: John Breaux

House of Representatives

 Speaker: Dennis Hastert (R)

Majority (Republican) leadership

 Majority Leader: Dick Armey
 Majority Whip: Tom DeLay
 Chief Deputy Whip: Roy Blunt
 Republican Conference Chairman: J. C. Watts
 Republican Conference Vice-Chairman: Deborah Pryce
 Republican Conference Secretary: Barbara Cubin
 Policy Committee Chairman: Christopher Cox
 Republican Campaign Committee Chairman: Thomas M. Davis
 House Rules Committee Chairman: David Dreier

Minority (Democratic) leadership 
 Minority Leader: Dick Gephardt
 Minority Whip: David E. Bonior, until January 15, 2002
 Nancy Pelosi, from January 15, 2002
 Chief Deputy Minority Whips: John Lewis, Ed Pastor, Max Sandlin & Maxine Waters
 Democratic Caucus Chairman: Martin Frost
 Democratic Caucus Vice Chairman: Bob Menendez
 Democratic Campaign Committee Chairman: Nita Lowey

Members
 Skip to House of Representatives, below

Senate
Senators are listed by their class. In this Congress, Class 2 meant their term ended with this Congress, facing re-election in 2002; Class 3 meant their term began in the previous Congress, facing re-election in 2004; and Class 1 meant their term began in this Congress, facing re-election in 2006.

Alabama
 2. Jeff Sessions (R)
 3. Richard Shelby (R)

Alaska
 2. Ted Stevens (R)
 3. Frank Murkowski (R), until December 2, 2002
 Lisa Murkowski (R), from December 20, 2002

Arizona
 1. Jon Kyl (R)
 3. John McCain (R)

Arkansas
 2. Tim Hutchinson (R)
 3. Blanche Lincoln (D)

California
 1. Dianne Feinstein (D)
 3. Barbara Boxer (D)

Colorado
 2. Wayne Allard (R)
 3. Ben Nighthorse Campbell (R)

Connecticut
 1. Joe Lieberman (D)
 3. Chris Dodd (D)

Delaware
 1. Tom Carper (D)
 2. Joe Biden (D)

Florida
 1. Bill Nelson (D)
 3. Bob Graham (D)

Georgia
 2. Max Cleland (D)
 3. Zell Miller (D)

Hawaii
 1. Daniel Akaka (D)
 3. Daniel Inouye (D)

Idaho
 2. Larry Craig (R)
 3. Mike Crapo (R)

Illinois
 2. Richard Durbin (D)
 3. Peter Fitzgerald (R)

Indiana
 1. Richard Lugar (R)
 3. Evan Bayh (D)

Iowa
 2. Tom Harkin (D)
 3. Chuck Grassley (R)

Kansas
 2. Pat Roberts (R)
 3. Sam Brownback (R)

Kentucky
 2. Mitch McConnell (R)
 3. Jim Bunning (R)

Louisiana
 2. Mary Landrieu (D)
 3. John Breaux (D)

Maine
 1. Olympia Snowe (R)
 2. Susan Collins (R)

Maryland
 1. Paul Sarbanes (D)
 3. Barbara Mikulski (D)

Massachusetts
 1. Ted Kennedy (D)
 2. John Kerry (D)

Michigan
 1. Debbie Stabenow (D)
 2. Carl Levin (D)

Minnesota
 1. Mark Dayton (DFL)
 2. Paul Wellstone (DFL), until October 25, 2002
 Dean Barkley (IPM), from November 4, 2002

Mississippi
 1. Trent Lott (R)
 2. Thad Cochran (R)

Missouri
 1. Jean Carnahan (D), until November 23, 2002
 Jim Talent (R), from November 23, 2002
 3. Kit Bond (R)

Montana
 1. Conrad Burns (R)
 2. Max Baucus (D)

Nebraska
 1. Ben Nelson (D)
 2. Chuck Hagel (R)

Nevada
 1. John Ensign (R)
 3. Harry Reid (D)

New Hampshire
 2. Bob Smith (R)
 3. Judd Gregg (R)

New Jersey
 1. Jon Corzine (D)
 2. Robert Torricelli (D)

New Mexico
 1. Jeff Bingaman (D)
 2. Pete Domenici (R)

New York
 1. Hillary Clinton (D)
 3. Chuck Schumer (D)

North Carolina
 2. Jesse Helms (R)
 3. John Edwards (D)

North Dakota
 1. Kent Conrad (D-NPL)
 3. Byron Dorgan (D-NPL)

Ohio
 1. Mike DeWine (R)
 3. George Voinovich (R)

Oklahoma
 2. James Inhofe (R)
 3. Don Nickles (R)

Oregon
 2. Gordon Smith (R)
 3. Ron Wyden (D)

Pennsylvania
 1. Rick Santorum (R)
 3. Arlen Specter (R)

Rhode Island
 1. Lincoln Chafee (R)
 2. Jack Reed (D)

South Carolina
 2. Strom Thurmond (R)
 3. Ernest Hollings (D)

South Dakota
 2. Tim Johnson (D)
 3. Tom Daschle (D)

Tennessee
 1. Bill Frist (R)
 2. Fred Thompson (R)

Texas
 1. Kay Bailey Hutchison (R)
 2. Phil Gramm (R), until November 30, 2002
 John Cornyn (R), from December 2, 2002

Utah
 1. Orrin Hatch (R)
 3. Bob Bennett (R)

Vermont
 1. Jim Jeffords (R until June 6, 2001, then I)
 3. Patrick Leahy (D)

Virginia
 1. George Allen (R)
 2. John Warner (R)

Washington
 1. Maria Cantwell (D)
 3. Patty Murray (D)

West Virginia
 1. Robert Byrd (D)
 2. Jay Rockefeller (D)

Wisconsin
 1. Herb Kohl (D)
 3. Russ Feingold (D)

Wyoming
 1. Craig L. Thomas (R)
 2. Mike Enzi (R)

House of Representatives
Congressional district numbers are linked to articles describing the district itself.

Alabama
 . Sonny Callahan (R)
 . Terry Everett (R)
 . Bob Riley (R)
 . Robert Aderholt (R)
 . Robert E. Cramer (D)
 . Spencer Bachus (R)
 . Earl Hilliard (D)

Alaska
 . Don Young (R)

Arizona
 . Jeff Flake (R)
 . Ed Pastor (D)
 . Bob Stump (R)
 . John Shadegg (R)
 . Jim Kolbe (R)
 . J. D. Hayworth (R)

Arkansas
 . Robert Marion Berry (D)
 . Vic Snyder (D)
 . Asa Hutchinson (R), until August 5, 2001
 John Boozman (R), from November 20, 2001
 . Mike Ross (D)

California
 . Mike Thompson (D)
 . Wally Herger (R)
 . Doug Ose (R)
 . John Doolittle (R)
 . Bob Matsui (D)
 . Lynn Woolsey (D)
 . George Miller (D)
 . Nancy Pelosi (D)
 . Barbara Lee (D)
 . Ellen Tauscher (D)
 . Richard Pombo (R)
 . Tom Lantos (D)
 . Pete Stark (D)
 . Anna Eshoo (D)
 . Mike Honda (D)
 . Zoe Lofgren (D)
 . Sam Farr (D)
 . Gary Condit (D)
 . George Radanovich (R)
 . Cal Dooley (D)
 . Bill Thomas (R)
 . Lois Capps (D)
 . Elton Gallegly (R)
 . Brad Sherman (D)
 . Howard McKeon (R)
 . Howard Berman (D)
 . Adam Schiff (D)
 . David Dreier (R)
 . Henry Waxman (D)
 . Xavier Becerra (D)
 . Hilda Solis (D)
 . Diane Watson (D), from June 5, 2001
 . Lucille Roybal-Allard (D)
 . Grace Napolitano (D)
 . Maxine Waters (D)
 . Jane Harman (D)
 . Juanita Millender-McDonald (D)
 . Steve Horn (R)
 . Ed Royce (R)
 . Jerry Lewis (R)
 . Gary Miller (R)
 . Joe Baca (D)
 . Ken Calvert (R)
 . Mary Bono (R)
 . Dana Rohrabacher (R)
 . Loretta Sanchez (D)
 . Christopher Cox (R)
 . Darrell Issa (R)
 . Susan Davis (D)
 . Bob Filner (D)
 . Duke Cunningham (R)
 . Duncan L. Hunter (R)

Colorado
 . Diana DeGette (D)
 . Mark Udall (D)
 . Scott McInnis (R)
 . Bob Schaffer (R)
 . Joel Hefley (R)
 . Tom Tancredo (R)

Connecticut
 . John B. Larson (D)
 . Rob Simmons (R)
 . Rosa DeLauro (D)
 . Chris Shays (R)
 . James H. Maloney (D)
 . Nancy Johnson (R)

Delaware
 . Mike Castle (R)

Florida
 . Joe Scarborough (R), until September 6, 2001
 Jeff Miller (R), from October 16, 2001
 . Allen Boyd (D)
 . Corrine Brown (D)
 . Ander Crenshaw (R)
 . Karen Thurman (D)
 . Cliff Stearns (R)
 . John Mica (R)
 . Ric Keller (R)
 . Michael Bilirakis (R)
 . Bill Young (R)
 . Jim Davis (D)
 . Adam Putnam (R)
 . Dan Miller (R)
 . Porter Goss (R)
 . Dave Weldon (R)
 . Mark Foley (R)
 . Carrie Meek (D)
 . Ileana Ros-Lehtinen (R)
 . Robert Wexler (D)
 . Peter Deutsch (D)
 . Lincoln Diaz-Balart (R)
 . Clay Shaw (R)
 . Alcee Hastings (D)

Georgia
 . Jack Kingston (R)
 . Sanford Bishop (D)
 . Mac Collins (R)
 . Cynthia McKinney (D)
 . John Lewis (D)
 . Johnny Isakson (R)
 . Bob Barr (R)
 . Saxby Chambliss (R)
 . Nathan Deal (R)
 . Charlie Norwood (R)
 . John Linder (R)

Hawaii
 . Neil Abercrombie (D)
 . Patsy Mink (D), until September 28, 2002
 Ed Case (D), from November 30, 2002

Idaho
 . Butch Otter (R)
 . Mike Simpson (R)

Illinois
 . Bobby Rush (D)
 . Jesse Jackson Jr. (D)
 . Bill Lipinski (D)
 . Luis Gutierrez (D)
 . Rod Blagojevich (D)
 . Henry Hyde (R)
 . Danny K. Davis (D)
 . Philip Crane (R)
 . Jan Schakowsky (D)
 . Mark Kirk (R)
 . Jerry Weller (R)
 . Jerry Costello (D)
 . Judy Biggert (R)
 . Dennis Hastert (R)
 . Tim Johnson (R)
 . Don Manzullo (R)
 . Lane Evans (D)
 . Ray LaHood (R)
 . David D. Phelps (D)
 . John Shimkus (R)

Indiana
 . Pete Visclosky (D)
 . Mike Pence (R)
 . Tim Roemer (D)
 . Mark Souder (R)
 . Steve Buyer (R)
 . Dan Burton (R)
 . Brian D. Kerns (R)
 . John Hostettler (R)
 . Baron Hill (D)
 . Julia Carson (D)

Iowa
 . Jim Leach (R)
 . Jim Nussle (R)
 . Leonard Boswell (D)
 . Greg Ganske (R)
 . Tom Latham (R)

Kansas
 . Jerry Moran (R)
 . Jim Ryun (R)
 . Dennis Moore (D)
 . Todd Tiahrt (R)

Kentucky
 . Ed Whitfield (R)
 . Ron Lewis (R)
 . Anne Northup (R)
 . Ken Lucas (D)
 . Hal Rogers (R)
 . Ernie Fletcher (R)

Louisiana
 . David Vitter (R)
 . William J. Jefferson (D)
 . Billy Tauzin (R)
 . Jim McCrery (R)
 . John Cooksey (R)
 . Richard H. Baker (R)
 . Chris John (D)

Maine
 . Tom Allen (D)
 . John Baldacci (D)

Maryland
 . Wayne Gilchrest (R)
 . Bob Ehrlich (R)
 . Ben Cardin (D)
 . Albert Wynn (D)
 . Steny Hoyer (D)
 . Roscoe Bartlett (R)
 . Elijah Cummings (D)
 . Connie Morella (R)

Massachusetts
 . John Olver (D)
 . Richard Neal (D)
 . Jim McGovern (D)
 . Barney Frank (D)
 . Marty Meehan (D)
 . John F. Tierney (D)
 . Ed Markey (D)
 . Mike Capuano (D)
 . Joe Moakley (D) until May 28, 2001
 Stephen F. Lynch (D), from October 16, 2001
 . Bill Delahunt (D)

Michigan
 . Bart Stupak (D)
 . Peter Hoekstra (R)
 . Vern Ehlers (R)
 . Dave Camp (R)
 . James A. Barcia (D)
 . Fred Upton (R)
 . Nick Smith (R)
 . Mike Rogers (R)
 . Dale Kildee (D)
 . David Bonior (D)
 . Joe Knollenberg (R)
 . Sander Levin (D)
 . Lynn N. Rivers (D)
 . John Conyers (D)
 . Carolyn Cheeks Kilpatrick (D)
 . John Dingell (D)

Minnesota
 . Gil Gutknecht (R)
 . Mark Kennedy (R)
 . Jim Ramstad (R)
 . Betty McCollum (DFL)
 . Martin Olav Sabo (DFL)
 . Bill Luther (DFL)
 . Collin Peterson (DFL)
 . Jim Oberstar (DFL)

Mississippi
 . Roger Wicker (R)
 . Bennie Thompson (D)
 . Chip Pickering (R)
 . Ronnie Shows (D)
 . Gene Taylor (D)

Missouri
 . Lacy Clay (D)
 . Todd Akin (R)
 . Dick Gephardt (D)
 . Ike Skelton (D)
 . Karen McCarthy (D)
 . Sam Graves (R)
 . Roy Blunt (R)
 . Jo Ann Emerson (R)
 . Kenny Hulshof (R)

Montana
 . Denny Rehberg (R)

Nebraska
 . Doug Bereuter (R)
 . Lee Terry (R)
 . Tom Osborne (R)

Nevada
 . Shelley Berkley (D)
 . Jim Gibbons (R)

New Hampshire
 . John E. Sununu (R)
 . Charles Bass (R)

New Jersey
 . Rob Andrews (D)
 . Frank LoBiondo (R)
 . Jim Saxton (R)
 . Chris Smith (R)
 . Marge Roukema (R)
 . Frank Pallone (D)
 . Mike Ferguson (R)
 . Bill Pascrell (D)
 . Steve Rothman (D)
 . Donald M. Payne (D)
 . Rodney Frelinghuysen (R)
 . Rush Holt Jr. (D)
 . Bob Menendez (D)

New Mexico
 . Heather Wilson (R)
 . Joe Skeen (R)
 . Tom Udall (D)

New York
 . Felix Grucci (R)
 . Steve Israel (D)
 . Peter T. King (R)
 . Carolyn McCarthy (D)
 . Gary Ackerman (D)
 . Gregory Meeks (D)
 . Joe Crowley (D)
 . Jerry Nadler (D)
 . Anthony Weiner (D)
 . Edolphus Towns (D)
 . Major Owens (D)
 . Nydia Velázquez (D)
 . Vito Fossella (R)
 . Carolyn Maloney (D)
 . Charles Rangel (D)
 . José E. Serrano (D)
 . Eliot Engel (D)
 . Nita Lowey (D)
 . Sue W. Kelly (R)
 . Benjamin Gilman (R)
 . Michael R. McNulty (D)
 . John E. Sweeney (R)
 . Sherwood Boehlert (R)
 . John M. McHugh (R)
 . James T. Walsh (R)
 . Maurice Hinchey (D)
 . Thomas M. Reynolds (R)
 . Louise Slaughter (D)
 . John J. LaFalce (D)
 . Jack Quinn (R)
 . Amo Houghton (R)

North Carolina
 . Eva Clayton (D)
 . Bob Etheridge (D)
 . Walter B. Jones Jr. (R)
 . David Price (D)
 . Richard Burr (R)
 . Howard Coble (R)
 . Mike McIntyre (D)
 . Robin Hayes (R)
 . Sue Myrick (R)
 . Cass Ballenger (R)
 . Charles H. Taylor (R)
 . Mel Watt (D)

North Dakota
 . Earl Pomeroy (D-NPL)

Ohio
 . Steve Chabot (R)
 . Rob Portman (R)
 . Tony P. Hall (D), until September 9, 2002, vacant thereafter
 . Mike Oxley (R)
 . Paul Gillmor (R)
 . Ted Strickland (D)
 . Dave Hobson (R)
 . John Boehner (R)
 . Marcy Kaptur (D)
 . Dennis Kucinich (D)
 . Stephanie Tubbs Jones (D)
 . Pat Tiberi (R)
 . Sherrod Brown (D)
 . Thomas C. Sawyer (D)
 . Deborah Pryce (R)
 . Ralph Regula (R)
 . James Traficant (D), until July 24, 2002, vacant thereafter
 . Bob Ney (R)
 . Steve LaTourette (R)

Oklahoma
 . Steve Largent (R), until February 15, 2002
 John A. Sullivan (R), from February 15, 2002
 . Brad Carson (D)
 . Wes Watkins (R)
 . J. C. Watts (R)
 . Ernest Istook (R)
 . Frank Lucas (R)

Oregon
 . David Wu (D)
 . Greg Walden (R)
 . Earl Blumenauer (D)
 . Peter DeFazio (D)
 . Darlene Hooley (D)

Pennsylvania
 . Bob Brady (D)
 . Chaka Fattah (D)
 . Robert A. Borski Jr. (D)
 . Melissa Hart (R)
 . John E. Peterson (R)
 . Tim Holden (D)
 . Curt Weldon (R)
 . James C. Greenwood (R)
 . Bud Shuster (R), until February 3, 2001
 Bill Shuster (R), from May 15, 2001
 . Don Sherwood (R)
 . Paul Kanjorski (D)
 . John Murtha (D)
 . Joe Hoeffel (D)
 . William J. Coyne (D)
 . Pat Toomey (R)
 . Joe Pitts (R)
 . George Gekas (R)
 . Mike Doyle (D)
 . Todd Russell Platts (R)
 . Frank Mascara (D)
 . Phil English (R)

Rhode Island
 . Patrick J. Kennedy (D)
 . James Langevin (D)

South Carolina
 . Henry E. Brown Jr. (R)
 . Floyd Spence (R), until August 16, 2001
 Joe Wilson (R), from December 18, 2001
 . Lindsey Graham (R)
 . Jim DeMint (R)
 . John Spratt (D)
 . Jim Clyburn (D)

South Dakota
 . John Thune (R)

Tennessee
 . Bill Jenkins (R)
 . Jimmy Duncan (R)
 . Zach Wamp (R)
 . Van Hilleary (R)
 . Bob Clement (D)
 . Bart Gordon (D)
 . Ed Bryant (R)
 . John S. Tanner (D)
 . Harold Ford Jr. (D)

Texas
 . Max Sandlin (D)
 . Jim Turner (D)
 . Sam Johnson (R)
 . Ralph Hall (D)
 . Pete Sessions (R)
 . Joe Barton (R)
 . John Culberson (R)
 . Kevin Brady (R)
 . Nick Lampson (D)
 . Lloyd Doggett (D)
 . Chet Edwards (D)
 . Kay Granger (R)
 . Mac Thornberry (R)
 . Ron Paul (R)
 . Rubén Hinojosa (D)
 . Silvestre Reyes (D)
 . Charles Stenholm (D)
 . Sheila Jackson Lee (D)
 . Larry Combest (R)
 . Charlie Gonzalez (D)
 . Lamar Smith (R)
 . Tom DeLay (R)
 . Henry Bonilla (R)
 . Martin Frost (D)
 . Ken Bentsen (D)
 . Dick Armey (R)
 . Solomon P. Ortiz (D)
 . Ciro Rodriguez (D)
 . Gene Green (D)
 . Eddie Bernice Johnson (D)

Utah
 . James V. Hansen (R)
 . Jim Matheson (D)
 . Chris Cannon (R)

Vermont
 . Bernie Sanders (I)

Virginia
 . Jo Ann Davis (R)
 . Ed Schrock (R)
 . Bobby Scott (D)
 . Norman Sisisky (D), until March 29, 2001
 Randy Forbes (R), from June 19, 2001
 . Virgil Goode (R), (I prior to August 1, 2002)
 . Bob Goodlatte (R)
 . Eric Cantor (R)
 . Jim Moran (D)
 . Rick Boucher (D)
 . Frank Wolf (R)
 . Tom Davis (R)

Washington
 . Jay Inslee (D)
 . Rick Larsen (D)
 . Brian Baird (D)
 . Doc Hastings (R)
 . George Nethercutt (R)
 . Norman D. Dicks (D)
 . Jim McDermott (D)
 . Jennifer Dunn (R)
 . Adam Smith (D)

West Virginia
 . Alan Mollohan (D)
 . Shelley Moore Capito (R)
 . Nick Rahall (D)

Wisconsin
 . Paul Ryan (R)
 . Tammy Baldwin (D)
 . Ron Kind (D)
 . Jerry Kleczka (D)
 . Tom Barrett (D)
 . Tom Petri (R)
 . Dave Obey (D)
 . Mark Andrew Green (R)
 . Jim Sensenbrenner (R)

Wyoming
 . Barbara Cubin (R)

Non-voting members
 . Eni Faleomavaega (D)
 . Eleanor Holmes Norton (D)
 . Robert A. Underwood (D)
 . Aníbal Acevedo Vilá (Res. Comm.) (D/PPD)
 . Donna Christian-Christensen (D)

Changes in membership

Senate

|-
| Vermont (1)
| nowrap  | Jim Jeffords (R)
| Incumbent changed party and joined the Democratic caucus.
| nowrap  | Jim Jeffords (I)
| June 6, 2001

|-
| Minnesota (2)
| nowrap  | Paul Wellstone (D)
| Incumbent died October 25, 2002.Successor appointed to serve the remaining two months of the term.
| nowrap  | Dean Barkley (IMN)
| November 4, 2002

|-
| Missouri (1)
| nowrap  | Jean Carnahan (D)
| Interim appointee lost election.Successor elected November 5, 2002.
| nowrap  | Jim Talent (R)
| November 23, 2002

|-
| Texas (2)
| nowrap  | Phil Gramm (R)
| Incumbent resigned November 30, 2002 to give successor seniority advantages.Successor appointed on December 2, 2002, having already been elected to the next term.
| nowrap  | John Cornyn (R)
| December 2, 2002

|-
| Alaska (3)
| nowrap  | Frank Murkowski (R)
| Incumbent resigned December 2, 2002 to become Governor of Alaska.Successor appointed to remainder of the term ending January 3, 2005.
| nowrap  | Lisa Murkowski (R)
| December 20, 2002

|}

House of Representatives

|-
| 
| Vacant
| Incumbent Julian Dixon (D) had died December 8, 2000, before the beginning of this Congress.A special election was held June 5, 2001.
| nowrap  | Diane Watson (D)
| June 5, 2001

|-
| 
| nowrap  | Bud Shuster (R)
| Incumbent resigned, effective January 31, 2001.A special election was held May 15, 2001.
| nowrap  | Bill Shuster (R)
| May 15, 2001

|-
| 
| nowrap  | Norman Sisisky (D)
| Incumbent died March 30, 2001.A special election was held June 19, 2001.
| nowrap  | Randy Forbes (R)
| June 19, 2001

|-
| 
| nowrap  | Joe Moakley (D)
| Incumbent died May 28, 2001.A special election was held October 16, 2001.
| nowrap  | Stephen F. Lynch (D)
| October 16, 2001

|-
| 
| nowrap  | Asa Hutchinson (R)
| Incumbent resigned August 5, 2001 to head the Drug Enforcement Administration.A special election was held November 20, 2001.
| nowrap  | John Boozman (R)
| November 20, 2001

|-
| 
| nowrap  | Floyd Spence (R)
| Incumbent died August 16, 2001.A special election was held December 18, 2001.
| nowrap  | Joe Wilson (R)
| December 18, 2001

|-
| 
| nowrap  | Joe Scarborough (R)
| Incumbent resigned, effective September 6, 2001.A special election was held October 16, 2001.
| nowrap  | Jeff Miller (R)
| October 16, 2001

|-
| 
| nowrap  | Steve Largent (R)
| Incumbent resigned, effective February 15, 2002, to concentrate on his campaign for governor.A special election was held January 8, 2002.
| nowrap  | John A. Sullivan (R)
| February 15, 2002

|-
| 
| nowrap  | Jim Traficant (D)
| Incumbent expelled July 24, 2002 for criminal conviction of 10 counts of bribery, racketeering, and tax evasion.
| Vacant 
| Not filled for remainder of Congress

|-
| 
| nowrap  | Virgil Goode (I)
| Incumbent changed party.
| nowrap  | Virgil Goode (R)
| August 1, 2002

|-
| 
| nowrap  | Tony P. Hall (D)
| Incumbent resigned September 9, 2002 after he was appointed to be the U.S. Ambassador to the United Nations Food and Agriculture Organization.
| Vacant 
| Not filled for remainder of Congress

|-
| 
| nowrap  | Patsy Mink (D)
| Incumbent died September 28, 2002 but was elected posthumously on November 5, 2002.
| nowrap  | Ed Case (D)
| November 30, 2002

|}

Committees

Senate
 Aging (Special) (Chair: John Breaux, then Larry Craig, then John Breaux)
 Agriculture, Nutrition and Forestry (Chair: Tom Harkin, then Richard Lugar, then Tom Harkin)
 Forestry, Conservation and Rural Revitalization (Chair: Blanche Lincoln)
 Marketing Inspection and Product Promotion (Chair: Max Baucus)
 Production and Price Competitiveness (Chair: Kent Conrad) 
 Research, Nutrition and General Legislation (Chair: Patrick Leahy)
 Appropriations (Chair: Robert Byrd, then Ted Stevens, then Robert Byrd)
 Agriculture, Rural Development and Related Agencies (Chair: Herb Kohl)
 Commerce, Justice, State and the Judiciary (Chair: Ernest F. Hollings)
 Defense (Chair: Daniel K. Inouye)
 District of Columbia (Chair: Mary Landrieu)
 Energy and Water Development (Chair: Harry Reid)
 Foreign Operations (Chair: Patrick Leahy)
 Interior (Chair: Robert Byrd)
 Labor, Health, Human Services and Education (Chair: Tom Harkin)
 Legislative Branch (Chair: Richard Durbin)
 Military Construction (Chair: Dianne Feinstein)
 Transportation (Chair: Patty Murray)
 Treasury and General Government (Chair: Byron Dorgan)
 VA, HUD and Independent Agencies (Chair: Barbara Mikulski)
 Armed Services (Chair: Carl Levin, then John Warner, then Carl Levin)
 Airland (Chair: Joe Lieberman)
 Emerging Threats and Capabilities (Chair: Mary Landrieu)
 Personnel (Chair: Max Cleland)
 Readiness and Management Support (Chair: Daniel Akaka)
 Seapower (Chair: Ted Kennedy)
 Strategic (Chair: Jack Reed)
 Banking, Housing and Urban Affairs (Chair: Paul Sarbanes, then Phil Gramm, then Paul Sarbanes)
 Economic Policy (Chair: Chuck Schumer)
 Financial Institutions (Chair: Tim Johnson)
 Housing and Transportation (Chair: Jack Reed)
 International Trade and Finance (Chair: Evan Bayh)
 Securities (Chair: Chris Dodd)
 Budget (Chair: Kent Conrad, then Pete Domenici, then Kent Conrad)
 Commerce, Science and Transportation (Chair: Ernest Hollings, then John McCain, then Ernest Hollings) 
 Aviation (Chair: Jay Rockefeller)
 Communications (Chair: Daniel Inouye)
 Consumer Affairs, Foreign Commerce and Tourism (Chair: Byron Dorgan)
 Oceans, Atmosphere and Fisheries (Chair: John Kerry)
 Science, Technology and Space (Chair: Ron Wyden)
 Surface Transportation and Merchant Marine (Chair: John Breaux)
 Energy and Natural Resources (Chair: Jeff Bingaman, then Frank Murkowski, then Jeff Bingaman)
 Energy Research, Development, Production and Regulation (Chair: Bob Graham)
 Forests and Public Land Management (Chair: Ron Wyden)
 National Parks, Historic Preservation and Recreation (Chair: Daniel Akaka)
 Water and Power (Chair: Byron L. Dorgan)
 Environment and Public Works (Chair: Harry Reid, then Bob Smith, then Jim Jeffords)
 Clean Air, Wetlands and Climate Change (Chair: Joe Lieberman)
 Fisheries, Wildlife, and Water (Chair: Bob Graham)
 Superfund, Toxics, Risk and Waste Management (Chair: Barbara Boxer)
 Transportation, Infrastructure and Nuclear Safety (Chair: Harry Reid)
 Ethics (Select) (Chair: Pat Roberts, then Harry Reid)
 Finance (Chair: Max Baucus, then Chuck Grassley, then Max Baucus)
 Health Care (Chair: Jay Rockefeller)
 International Trade (Chair: Max Baucus)
 Long-Term Growth and Debt Reduction (Chair: Bob Graham)
 Social Security and Family Policy (Chair: John Breaux)
 Taxation and IRS Oversight (Chair: Kent Conrad)
 Foreign Relations (Chair: Joe Biden, then Jesse Helms, then Joe Biden)
 African Affairs (Chair: Russ Feingold)
 Central Asia and the South Caucasus (Chair: Robert Torricelli)
 East Asian and Pacific Affairs (Chair: John Kerry)
 European Affairs (Chair: Joe Biden)
 International Economic Policy, Export and Trade Promotion (Chair: Paul Sarbanes)
 International Operations and Terrorism (Chair: Barbara Boxer)
 Near Eastern and South Asian Affairs (Chair: Paul Wellstone)
 Western Hemisphere, Peace Corps, Narcotics and Terrorism (Chair: Chris Dodd)
 Governmental Affairs (Chair: Joe Lieberman, then Fred Thompson, then Joe Lieberman)
 International Security, Proliferation and Federal Services (Chair: Daniel Akaka)
 Oversight of Government Management, Restructing and the District of Columbia (Chair: Richard Durbin)
 Permanent Subcommittee on Investigations (Chair: Carl Levin)
 Indian Affairs (Select) (Chair: Daniel Inouye, then Ben Nighthorse Campbell, then Daniel Inouye)
 Intelligence (Select) (Chair: Bob Graham, then Richard Shelby, then Bob Graham)
 Health, Education, Labor and Pensions (Chair: Ted Kennedy, then Jim Jeffords, then Ted Kennedy)
 Children and Families (Chair: Chris Dodd)
 Public Health (Chair: Ted Kennedy)
 Aging (Chair: Barbara Mikulski)
 Employment, Safety and Training (Chair: Paul Wellstone)
 Judiciary (Chair: Patrick Leahy, then Orrin Hatch, then Patrick Leahy)
 Administrative Oversight and the Courts (Chair: Chuck Schumer)
 Antitrust, Business Rights and Competition (Chair: Herb Kohl)
 Constitution, Federalism and Property Rights (Chair: Russ Feingold)
 Crime and Drugs (Chair: Joe Biden)
 Immigration (Chair: Ted Kennedy)
 Technology, Terrorism and Government Information (Chair: Dianne Feinstein)
 Rules and Administration (Chair: Chris Dodd, then Mitch McConnell, then Chris Dodd)
 Small Business (Chair: John Kerry, then Kit Bond, then John Kerry)
 Veterans' Affairs (Chair: Jay Rockefeller, then Arlen Specter, then Jay Rockefeller)

House of Representatives
 Agriculture (Chair: Larry Combest, Vice Chair: John A. Boehner)
 Department Operations, Oversight, Nutrition and Forestry (Chair: Bob Goodlatte)
 Conservation, Credit, Rural Development and Research (Chair: Frank Lucas)
 Department Operations, Oversight, Nutrition and Forestry (Chair: Bob Goodlatte)
 General Farm Commodities and Risk Management  (Chair: Saxby Chambliss)
 Livestock and Horticulture  (Chair: Richard Pombo)
 Specialty Crops and Foreign Agriculture Programs (Chair: Richard Pombo)
 Appropriations (Chair: Bill Young)
 Agriculture, Rural Development, Food and Drug Administration and Related Agencies (Chair: Henry Bonilla)
 Commerce, Justice, State and Judiciary (Chair: Frank Wolf)
 Defense (Chair: Jerry Lewis)
 District of Columbia (Chair: Joe Knollenberg)
 Energy and Water Development (Chair: Sonny Callahan)
 Foreign Operations, Export Financing and Related Programs (Chair: Jim Kolbe)
 Interior (Chair: Joe Skeen)
 Labor, Health, Human Services and Education (Chair: Ralph Regula)
 Legislative (Chair: Charles H. Taylor)
 Military Construction (Chair: David L. Hobson)
 Transportation (Chair: Hal Rogers)
 Treasury, Postal Service and General Government (Chair: Ernest J. Istook)
 VA-HUD Independent Agencies (Chair: James T. Walsh)
 Armed Services (Chair: Bob Stump, Vice Chair: Floyd Spence)
 Military Installations and Facilities (Chair: Jim Saxton)
 Military Personnel (Chair: John M. McHugh, Vice Chair: Robin Hayes)
 Military Procurement (Chair: Floyd Spence then Curt Weldon, Vice Chair: Lindsey Graham)
 Military Readiness (Chair: Joel Hefley, Vice Chair: Bob Riley)
 Military Research and Development (Chair: Duncan D. Hunter, Vice Chair: Walter B. Jones Jr.)
 Special Oversight Panel on Morale, Welfare and Recreation (Chair: Roscoe G. Bartlett)
 Special Oversight Panel on the Merchant Marine (Chair: Duncan L. Hunter)
 Department of Energy Reorganization (Chair: Mac Thornberry, Vice Chair: Ken Calvert)
 Special Oversight Panel on Terrorism (Chair: Jim Saxton, Vice Chair: John N. Hostettler)
 Budget (Chair: Jim Nussle)
 Education and the Workforce (Chair: John Boehner, Vice Chair: Tom Petri)
 Employer-Employee Relations (Chair: Sam Johnson, Vice Chair: Ernie Fletcher)
 Workforce Protections (Chair: Charlie Norwood, Vice Chair: Judy Biggert)
 21st Century Competitiveness (Chair: Buck McKeon, Vice Chair: Johnny Isakson)
 Education Reform (Chair: Michael N. Castle, Vice Chair: Bob Schaffer)
 Select Education (Chair: Peter Hoekstra, Vice Chair: Pat Tiberi)
 Energy and Commerce (Chair: Billy Tauzin, Vice Chair: Richard Burr)
 Commerce, Trade and Consumer Production (Chair: Cliff Stearns, Vice Chair: Nathan Deal)
 Energy and Air Quality (Chair: Joe Barton, Vice Chair: Steve Largent)
 Environment and Hazardous Materials (Chair: Paul E. Gillmor, Vice Chair: John Shimkus)
 Health (Chair: Michael Bilirakis, Vice Chair: Charlie Norwood)
 Oversight and Investigations (Chair: James C. Greenwood, Vice Chair: Ed Whitfield)
 Telecommunications and the Internet (Chair: Fred Upton, Vice Chair: Cliff Stearns)
 Financial Services (Chair: Mike Oxley, Vice Chair: Marge Roukema)
 Capital Markets, Insurance and Government-Sponsored Enterprises (Chair: Richard H. Baker, Vice Chair: Robert W. Ney)
 Domestic Monetary Policy, Technology and Economic Growth (Chair: Peter T. King, Vice Chair: Jim Leach)
 Financial Institutions and Consumer Credit (Chair: Spencer Bachus, Vice Chair: Dave Weldon)
 Housing and Community Opportunity (Chair: Marge Roukema, Vice Chair: Mark Green)
 International Monetary Policy and Trade (Chair: Doug Bereuter, Vice Chair: Doug Ose)
 Oversight and Investigations (Chair: Sue W. Kelly, Vice Chair: Ron Paul)
 Government Reform (Chair: Dan Burton)
 Census (Chair: Dan Miller, Vice Chair: Chris Cannon)
 Civil Service and Agency Organization (Chair: Dave Weldon)
 Criminal Justice, Drug Policy and Human Resources (Chair: Mark Souder, Vice Chair: Benjamin A. Gilman)
 District of Columbia (Chair: Constance Morella, Vice Chair: Todd R. Platts)
 Energy Policy, Natural Resources and Regulatory Affairs (Chair: Doug Ose, Vice Chair: Butch Otter)
 Government Efficiency, Financial Management and Intergovernmental Relations (Chair: Stephen Horn, Vice Chair: Ron Lewis)
 National Security, Veterans' Affairs and International Relations (Chair: Christopher Shays, Vice Chair: Adam Putnam)
 Technology and Procurement Policy (Chair: Thomas M. Davis, Vice Chair: Jo Ann Davis)
 House Administration (Chair: Bob Ney)
 International Relations (Chair: Henry Hyde)
 Africa (Chair: Edward Royce)
 East Asia and the Pacific (Chair: Jim Leach)
 Europe (Chair: Elton Gallegly)
 International Operations and Human Rights (Chair: Ileana Ros-Lehtinen)
 The Middle East and South Asia (Chair: Benjamin Gilman)
 Western Hemisphere (Chair: Cass Ballenger)
 Judiciary (Chair: Jim Sensenbrenner)
 Commercial and Administrative Law (Chair: Bob Barr, Vice Chair: Jeff Flake)
 The Constitution (Chair: Steve Chabot, Vice Chair: Melissa Hart)
 Courts, the Internet and Intellectual Property (Chair: Howard Coble, Vice Chair: Bob Goodlatte)
 Crime (Chair: Lamar Smith)
 Immigration and Claims (Chair: George Gekas, Vice Chair: Chris Cannon)
 Resources (Chair: James V. Hansen, Vice Chair: Don Young)
 Energy and Mineral Resources (Chair: Barbara Cubin, Vice Chair: Jim Gibbons)
 Fisheries Conservation, Wildlife and Oceans (Chair: Wayne T. Gilchrest, Vice Chair: Jim Saxton)
 National Parks, Recreation and Public Lands (Chair: George P. Radanovich, Vice Chair: John E. Peterson)
 Forests and Forest Health (Chair: Scott McInnis, Vice Chair: Walter B. Jones Jr.)
 Water and Power (Chair: Ken Calvert, Vice Chair: George P. Radanovich)
 Rules (Chair: David Dreier, Vice Chair: Porter Goss)
 The Legislative Process (Chair: Deborah Pryce, Vice Chair: Porter Goss)
 Technology and the House (Chair: John Linder, Vice Chair: Lincoln Diaz-Balart)
 Science (Chair: Sherwood Boehlert, Vice Chair: Gil Gutknecht)
 Energy (Chair: Roscoe G. Bartlett, Vice Chair: Melissa A. Hart)
 Environment, Technology and Standards (Chair: Vernon J. Ehlers, Vice Chair: Felix J. Grucci Jr.)
 Research (Chair: Nick Smith, Vice Chair: Tim Johnson)
 Space and Aeronautics (Chair: Dana Rohrabacher, Vice Chair: Dave Weldon)
 Small Business (Chair: Don Manzullo) 
 Regulatory Reform and Oversight (Chair: Mike Pence)
 Rural Enterprises, Agriculture and Technology (Chair: John R. Thune)
 Tax, Finance and Exports (Chair: Patrick J. Toomey)
 Workforce, Empowerment and Government Programs (Chair: Jim DeMint)
 Standards of Official Conduct (Chair: Joel Hefley)
 Transportation and Infrastructure (Chair: Don Young, Vice Chair: Tom Petri)
 Aviation (Chair: John Mica, Vice Chair: John Cooksey)
 Coast Guard and Maritime Transportation (Chair: Frank LoBiondo, Vice Chair: Rob Simmons)
 Economic Development, Public Buildings and Emergency Management (Chair: Steven LaTourette, Vice Chair: Shelley Moore Capito)
 Highways and Transit (Chair: Tom Petri, Vice Chair: Mark R. Kennedy)
 Railroads (Chair: Jack Quinn, Vice Chair: Mike Ferguson)
 Water Resources and Environment (Chair: John J. Duncan, Vice Chair: Denny Rehberg)
 Veterans' Affairs (Chair: Chris Smith, Vice Chair: Michael Bilirakis)
 Benefits (Chair: Mike Simpson, Vice Chair: Floyd Spence)
 Health (Chair: Jerry Moran, Vice Chair: Cliff Stearns)
 Oversight and Investigations (Chair: Steve Buyer, Vice Chair: Bob Stump)
 Ways and Means (Chair: Bill Thomas)
 Health (Chair: Nancy Johnson)
 Human Resources (Chair: Wally Herger)
 Oversight (Chair: Amo Houghton)
 Select Revenue Measures (Chair: Jim McCrery)
 Social Security (Chair: E. Clay Shaw)
 Trade (Chair: Phil Crane)
 Whole

Joint committees

 Economic (Chair: Rep. Jim Saxton, Vice Chair: Sen. Jack Reed)
 Taxation (Chair: Rep. Bill Thomas, Vice Chair: Sen. Max Baucus)
 The Library (Chair: Rep. Vernon J. Ehlers, Vice Chair: Sen. Chris Dodd)
 Printing (Chair: Sen. Mark Dayton, Vice Chair: Rep. Robert W. Ney)

Caucuses

Employees

Legislative branch agency directors
 Architect of the Capitol: Alan M. Hantman
 Attending Physician of the United States Congress: John F. Eisold
 Comptroller General of the United States: David M. Walker
 Director of the Congressional Budget Office: Dan Crippen 
 Librarian of Congress: James H. Billington
 Public Printer of the United States: Michael F. DiMario, until 2002
 Bruce James, from 2002

Senate
 Chaplain: Lloyd John Ogilvie (Presbyterian)
 Curator: Diane K. Skvarla
 Historian: Richard A. Baker
 Parliamentarian: Bob Dove, until May 2001
 Alan Frumin, May 2001 - end
 Secretary: Gary Lee Sisco, until July 11, 2001
 Jeri Thomson, July 12, 2001 - end
 Librarian: Greg Harness
 Sergeant at Arms: James W. Ziglar, until August 2, 2001
 Alfonso E. Lenhardt, September 4, 2001 - end
 Secretary for the Majority / Minority:
 Martin P. Paone (Democrats)
 Elizabeth B. Letchworth (Republicans)
 David J. Schiappa (Republicans)

House of Representatives
 Chaplain: Daniel P. Coughlin (Roman Catholic)
 Chief Administrative Officer: James M. Eagen III
 Clerk: Jeff Trandahl
 Parliamentarian: Charles W. Johnson
 Reading Clerks:
 Mary Kevin Niland (D)
 Paul Hays (R)
 Sergeant at Arms: Wilson Livingood
Inspector General: Steven McNamara

See also
 List of new members of the 107th Congress
 2000 United States elections (elections leading to this Congress)
 2000 United States presidential election
 2000 United States Senate elections
 2000 United States House of Representatives elections
 2002 United States elections (elections during this Congress, leading to the next Congress)
 2002 United States Senate elections
 2002 United States House of Representatives elections

Notes

References

External links
 United States 107th Congress Web Archive from the U.S. Library of Congress
 Congress.gov
 History, Art and Archives from the United States House of Representatives
 Statistics & Lists from the United States Senate
Booknotes interview with Tom Daschle on Like No Other Time: The 107th Congress and the Two Years That Changed America, November 30, 2003.
 
 
 
 
 
 
 
 
 

 
Articles containing video clips